ITERA is the acronym for the Information and Telecommunications Education and Research Association.   ITERA is a 501(c)(3) non-profit organization and was founded on the principle that leading educational institutions can greatly benefit from cooperative development of curricular and research objectives.  

Through periodic conferences ITERA seeks to obtain greater consistency in the development of its members' degree programs and the kinds of courses for educating future telecommunications leaders.

Membership 
As of October 2008, its university membership includes:
 Ball State University
 Fort Hays State University
 James Madison University
 Illinois State University
 Liberty University
 Marion Technical College
 Michigan State University
 Murray State University
 Ohio University
 Oklahoma State University
 Pace University
 Purdue University
 Sauk Valley Community College
 Syracuse University
 Texas A&M University
 University of Colorado at Boulder
 University of Oklahoma Tulsa
 University of Pittsburgh
 Western Michigan University.

External links

 Official Site for ITERA, the International Telecommunications Education and Research Association

Telecommunications organizations